Grovely may refer to

Places
Grovely Wood, in Wiltshire, England
Grovely, Queensland, in Australia (now known as Keperra)
Grovely railway station, Brisbane
Grovely, a settlement in Brunswick County, North Carolina, USA